Coral Hill is a peak in Antarctica, rising to about   east of Auger Hill in the Keble Hills of the Scott Coast, Victoria Land. As its name, applied by the New Zealand Geographic Board in 1994 suggests, it consists of delicate rock shapes, resembling filmy reef corals, that have been created by years of wind erosion.

References
 

Hills of Victoria Land
Scott Coast